Kirkhamgate is a village, north-west of Wakefield, West Yorkshire, England. It originated as a hamlet in the Alverthorpe township in the parish of Wakefield in the West Riding of Yorkshire.

Geography

Kirkhamgate is situated on rising ground at a junction on the Wakefield to Batley road to the east of the M1 motorway. It is primarily a residential village surrounded by farmland that is part of the Rhubarb Triangle.

Events
Kirkhamgate holds an annual scarecrow festival in September.

References

External links

Villages in West Yorkshire
Geography of the City of Wakefield